Sylvia McNeill (born 5 August 1947, Harrogate, West Riding of Yorkshire, England) is a British pop and rock singer and songwriter.

She began her career singing and playing bass guitar with various groups and bands. She went abroad for several years, touring American bases on the continent. In 1969 she moved to London; since then she has appeared as a soloist in cabaret through the UK.

As well as a bass player for Leapy Lee, she recorded as a solo vocalist from 1968 to 1975, including RCA, Bell, and United Artists labels and she recorded such titles as “That's Alright By Me”(composer Richard Kerr), “Ugly Man” (composer Jim Ford), “Chelsea Morning” (composer Joni Mitchell), “Be My Friend” (originally by Free), “A Whiter Shade Of Pale” (originally by Procol Harum) and “I Don't Know How To Love Him” (composers Andrew Lloyd Webber & Tim Rice) - the latter was released (11 August 1972), as by Sylvie McNeill, in time for the first UK stage musical of Jesus Christ Superstar; she had performed it on The Benny Hill Show (original air date: 23 February 1972). Her producers included Kenny Young, Jack Good, Tony Hall, Tony Macaulay, and Ed Welch.

In one eighteen-month period, Sylvia McNeill made over thirty appearances on television, including The Benny Hill Show, The Dave Allen Show, The Morecambe & Wise Show, The Simon Dee Show, The Dick Emery Show, Roger Whittaker’s World Of Music, The Golden Shot, Anglia Television's Glamour '70 series (The search for Miss Anglia 1970, Heat 7 - staged in Grimsby, England), Ulster TV and her own eight-week series for Grampian Television.

In addition to her own recordings, she sang on the track "Anne Boleyn/The Day Thou Gavest Lord Hath Ended" for keyboardist Rick Wakeman's 1973 album The Six Wives of Henry VIII.

In 1971 she acted in Emil Dean Zoghby and Ray Pohlman's musical, Catch My Soul, at the Prince of Wales Theatre in London, England with Lance LeGault, Lon Satton, Sharon Gurney, and Malcolm Rennie in the cast. This rock musical was produced by Jack Good and directed by Braham Murray and Michael Elliott.

References

1947 births
Living people
People from Harrogate
Women rock singers
British pop singers
British women singer-songwriters